David Michael Castain II (born August 5, 1988), is an American businessman. He is perhaps best known for leaving a life of crime to later found a marketing firm worth over $5 million by November 2016 and $8.5 million by 2020.

Early life
David was born in Pomona Valley Hospital in Pomona, California to Debra Ross and David Castain Sr.. He joined a gang when he was in the 8th grade for protection within his community. David was kicked out of multiple high schools before attending Valley View High School, a secondary school for students who have behavioral issues or are at risk of not graduating. He ultimately graduated from Alta Loma High School. In 2006 Castain was charged with armed robbery. He decided to attend Howard University when he was serving an 8-month house arrest term following the two years he had already served behind bars.

Career
Castain began promoting parties while attending Howard University in Washington, DC. He gained national attention after he organized events with Sean Combs, Drake, LeBron James and other celebrities. In 2012 David was hired by Grey Goose where he served as their Director of Social Marketing. Following his seventh year of leaving a life of crime, he founded a nonprofit organization, the David Castain Foundation. In May 2013 David graduated from Howard University with a Bachelors in Speech and Applied Communication and a minor in sociology. He was the commencement speaker at his graduation ceremony Upon graduating, he founded a marketing firm dubbed David Castain & Associates. The company obtained clients in various disciplines from Chipotle and Uber to a Berkshire Hathaway subsidiary, Cort Furniture. In 2014 he graduated from Georgetown University, where he was the recipient of the Golden Bulldog Award for being the 'Most Creative' student in the program, with a Master's in public relations and corporate communications. Castain returned to his alma mater, Howard University in August of that same year to pursue his Ph.D. in sociology, with a concentration in medical sociology and social inequality. Castain is a member of the Kappa Alpha Psi Greek fraternal organization. In 2021, Forbes named him to their Next 1000 list.

Filmography

References

External links
David Castain’s Official Website
Rank Today David Castain’s New Venture

Howard University alumni
Georgetown University alumni
African-American businesspeople
21st-century American businesspeople
Living people
1988 births
People from Pomona, California
American marketing people
21st-century African-American people
20th-century African-American people